Pobalscoil Iosolde (Palmerstown community school) is a secondary level school in Palmerstown, Dublin, Ireland.

External links
Palmerstown Community School

Secondary schools in South Dublin (county)
Community schools in the Republic of Ireland
Palmerstown